Waterloo Street (Chinese: 滑铁卢街/四马路) is a two-way street in downtown Singapore stretching from Rochor Road to Bras Basah Road. It passes through the planning areas of Rochor and Museum Planning Area. 

Formerly a one-way street, the street has been converted to a two-way street and the northern end of the street has been converted into a pedestrian mall to ease the problem of traffic jams, as well as the crowd at Kwan Im Thong Hood Co Temple, which was most packed during the weekends and public holidays. The street, which previously extended to Stamford Road, has been shortened after the construction of the Singapore Management University's city campus and the MRT station.  

There are several well-known landmarks, including the Kwan Im Thong Hood Cho Temple, Maghain Aboth Synagogue, Sculpture Square, and Sri Krishnan Temple. The Maghain Aboth Synagogue is the oldest synagogue in Singapore and was built by the local Jewish community in 1878. 

Waterloo Street is parallel to North Bridge Road, Victoria Street, and Queen Street (in sequence); these were previously the major roads to the city.  As the road names were too difficult to pronounce for the locals, they simply called them Toa Beh Lo, Tzee Beh Lo, and Sa Beh Lo which means "the big (first) road", "the second road", "the third road". The Hokkiens and Teochews call Waterloo Street si beh lo which simply means "the fourth road".

Landmarks
In order from Rochor Road to Bras Basah Road:

OG Albert Complex
The Bencoolen
Fu Lu Shou Complex
Albert Centre and Cheng Yan Court
Kwan Im Thong Hood Cho Temple
Sri Krishnan Temple
Fortune Centre
Sculpture Square (Former Middle Road Church, which is now known as Kampong Kapor Methodist Church)
Maghain Aboth Synagogue
Singapore Art Museum 
Plaza by the Park

References

 Victor R Savage, Brenda S A Yeoh (2004), Toponymics – A Study of Singapore's Street Names, Easter University Press.

Roads in Singapore
Museum Planning Area
Rochor
1837 establishments in Asia
19th-century establishments in Singapore